The Radio Technical Commission for Maritime Services (RTCM) is a non-profit international standards organization. Although started in 1947 as a U.S. government advisory committee, RTCM is now an independent organization supported by its member organizations from all over the world.

In the United States, the Federal Communications Commission and U.S. Coast Guard use RTCM standards to specify systems such as radar, Emergency Position Indicating Radio Beacons, Electronic Navigation Charts and Maritime Survivor Locator Devices.

Special committees
RTCM Special Committees are formed to provide in-depth areas of concern to the RTCM membership, these special committees normally produce documents in the form of standards.

Current special committees are

 Special Committee (SC) 101 on Digital Selective Calling (DSC)
 Joint Special Committee (SC) 101/110 on GPS Equipped Hand Held VHF Radios
 Special Committee (SC) 104 on Differential Global Navigation Satellite Systems (DGNSS). Provides standards that are often used in Differential GPS and Real Time Kinematic operations.
 Special Committee (SC) 109 on Electronic Charts
 Special Committee (SC) 110 on Emergency Beacons (EPIRBs and PLBs)
 Special Committee (SC) 117 on Maritime VHF Interference
 Special Committee (SC) 119 on Maritime Survivor Locator Devices
 Special Committee (SC) 112 on Ship Radar
 Special Committee (SC) 117 on Maritime VHF Interference
 Special Committee (SC) 119 on Maritime Survivor Locating Devices
 Special Committee (SC) 121 on Automatic Identification Systems (AIS) and digital Messaging
 Special Committee (SC) 123 on VHF-FM Digital Small Message Services
 Special Committee (SC) 127 on Enhanced Loran (eLoran)
 Special Committee (SC) 128 on Satellite Emergency Notification Device (SEND)
 Special Committee (SC) 134 on Integrity for High-Accuracy GNSS Applications
 Special Committee (SC) 135 on Radio Layers for Real-Time DGNSS Applications
 Special Committee (SC) 136 on Beacon Type Approvals
 Special Committee (SC) 137 on Electromagnetic Compatibility Requirements for LED Devices and other Unintentional Emitters        Located Near Shipboard Antennas
 Special Committee (SC) 138 on Ranging Mode (R-Mode) Application for VHF Data Exchange System (VDES)

See also
National Marine Electronics Association
Networked Transport of RTCM via Internet Protocol (NTRIP)

External links 
The Radio Technical Commission for Maritime Services

Standards organizations in the United States
Telecommunications organizations
Maritime organizations